Sergio Martino (born 19 July 1938) is an Italian film director and producer, notable for his contributions to the giallo genre.

Martino is the brother of the late producer Luciano Martino (who died in 2013). They collaborated frequently in their respective professions. Their grandfather was director Gennaro Righelli.

Sergio Martino worked for both the big screen as well as for Italian television where he does most of his current work. He often worked with actress Edwige Fenech who in the 1970s was married to his brother Luciano. He also worked with many genre actors such as George Hilton (who was married to Sergio's cousin), Anita Strindberg, Ivan Rassimov and Claudio Cassinelli, as well as famed Italian screenwriter Ernesto Gastaldi.

Martino's pseudonyms include: Julian Barry, Martin Dolman, Serge Martin, Christian Plummer, George Raminto.

Selected filmography 
Note: The films listed as N/A are not necessarily chronological.

References

Bibliography

External links
 
 

1938 births
Italian film directors
Film directors from Rome
Spaghetti Western directors
Horror film directors
Living people
Giallo film directors
Poliziotteschi directors